Acanthopsyche is a genus of moths in the Psychidae family. The genus was named by the Dutch entomologist Franciscus J.M. Heylaerts.

The males are relatively large, with a wingspan of 15–28 mm. The females are apterous (i.e. wingless) and have rudimentary antennae and legs. The eyes are reduced to black spots. The larvae live in a case which is covered longitudinally with plant matter.

Species
Acanthopsyche atra (Linnaeus, 1767)
Acanthopsyche calamochroa (Hampson, 1910)
Acanthopsyche carayoni Bourgogne, 1986
Acanthopsyche carbonaria Karsch, 1900
Acanthopsyche chrysora Bourgogne, 1980
Acanthopsyche ebneri (Rebel, 1917)
Acanthopsyche ecksteini (Lederer, 1855)
Acanthopsyche emiliae (Heylaerts, 1890)
Acanthopsyche entwistlei Bourgogne, 1962
Acanthopsyche ernsti Bourgogne, 1980
Acanthopsyche melanoleuca Bourgogne, 1965
Acanthopsyche mixta Bourgogne, 1962
Acanthopsyche modesta Bourgogne, 1978
Acanthopsyche multicaulis Bourgogne, 1985
Acanthopsyche ogiva Bourgogne, 1984
Acanthopsyche pauliani Bourgogne, 1984
Acanthopsyche phaea Bourgogne, 1979
Acanthopsyche roomei Bourgogne, 1984
Acanthopsyche siederi Szőcs, 1961
Acanthopsyche sierricola (White, 1858)
Acanthopsyche tristis Janse, 1917
Acanthopsyche tristoides Bourgogne, 1965
Acanthopsyche zelleri (Mann, 1856)
Acanthopsyche zernyi (Bourgogne, 1964)

References

 , 1972: Revision einiger afrikanischer Psychidae-Gattungen (Lepidoptera) mit einem provisorischen verzeichnis der bekannten afrikanischen Makropsychiden. Mitteilungen der Münchener Entomologischen Gesellschaft 61: 16-63.
 , 2011: Die Psychidae (Lepidoptera) des Bismarck-Archipels gesammelt auf der Noona Dan Expedition 1961/62 aus dem Museum Kopenhagen mit einer Checklist der Psychidae Papua Neuguineas. Entomologische Zeitschrift 121 (6): 243-253.
 , 2011: World Catalogue of Insects Volume 10 Psychidae (Lepidoptera): 1-467.
 , 2004: New species of the Bagworm genus Acanthopsyche Heylaerts (Lepidoptera, Psychidae) from Saratov Area. Bulletin of Moscow Society of Naturalists, Biological Series 190 (4): 58-59.
 , 2010: An illustrated catalogue of primary type specimens of the Lepidoptera in collection of the Zoological Museum of Moscow State University described in the second half of XXth century. Eversmannia 21/22: 6-27.

External links

 Natural History Museum Lepidoptera generic names catalog

Psychidae
Psychidae genera